Giovanni Leonardo Bottiglieri (died 1599) was a Roman Catholic prelate who served as Bishop of Lettere-Gragnano (1591–1599).

Biography
On 14 January 1591, Giovanni Leonardo Bottiglieri was appointed during the papacy of Pope Gregory XIV as Bishop of Lettere-Gragnano. 
On 3 February 1591, he was consecrated bishop by Filippo Spinola, Cardinal-Priest of Santa Sabina, with César Alamagna Cardona, Bishop of Cava de' Tirreni, and Owen Lewis (bishop), Bishop of Cassano all'Jonio, serving as co-consecrators. 
He served as Bishop of Lettere-Gragnano until his death in 1599.

References

External links and additional sources
 (for Chronology of Bishops) 
 (for Chronology of Bishops)  

16th-century Italian Roman Catholic bishops
Bishops appointed by Pope Gregory XIV
1599 deaths